The 2021–22 Kategoria e Tretë was the 19th official season of the Albanian football fourth division since its establishment. The season began on 7 December 2021 and ended in 6 May 2022. There were 8 teams competing this season. AF Elbasani, Delvina and Valbona gained promotion to the 2022–23 Kategoria e Dytë. AF Elbasani won their first Kategoria e Tretë title.

Changes from last season

Team changes

From Kategoria e Tretë
Promoted to Kategoria e Dytë:
 Luftëtari
 Murlani

To Kategoria e Tretë
Relegated from Kategoria e Dytë:
 Delvina
 Skrapari
 Valbona

Stadia by capacity and locations

League standings

Results

Top scorers

References

4
Albania
Kategoria e Tretë seasons